This is a list of the top selling singles and top sellings albums in Ireland in 2001.

Top selling singles 
 "I'm a Slave 4 U" - Britney Spears
 "It Wasn't Me" - Shaggy
 "Uptown Girl" - Westlife
 "Hey Baby" - DJ Ötzi
 "Teenage Dirtbag" - Wheatus
 "It's Raining Men" - Geri Halliwell
 "Can't Get You Out of My Head" - Kylie Minogue
 "Whole Again" - Atomic Kitten
 "Don't Stop Movin'" - S Club 7
 "Lady Marmalade" - Christina Aguilera, Lil' Kim, Mýa, Pink and Missy Elliott

Top selling albums 
 Britney - Britney Spears
 Swing When You're Winning - Robbie Williams
 World of Our Own - Westlife
 Survivor - Destiny's Child
 All That You Can't Leave Behind - U2
 White Ladder - David Grey
 Just Enough Education to Perform - Stereophonics
 Dreams Can Come True, Greatest Hits Vol. 1 - Gabrielle
 This Is the Day - Christy Moore
 Hybrid Theory - Linkin Park

Notes:
 *Compilation albums are not included.

See also 
List of songs that reached number one on the Irish Singles Chart
List of artists who reached number one in Ireland

Resources 
IRMA Official Site

External links 
IRMA Official Site
Top40-Charts - Ireland Top 20

2001 in Irish music
2001 record charts
2001